WJRM (1390 AM) is a radio station broadcasting a Gospel format. Licensed to Troy, North Carolina, United States.  The station is currently owned by Family Worship Ministries, Inc..

External links

JRM